Turn Off the Radio: The Mixtape Vol. 1 is a mixtape by political hip hop duo Dead Prez. The mixtape was released on November 19, 2002. It was released under the pseudonym DPZ due to a contractual conflict Dead Prez had with their former record label.

Track listing

Notes and samples
Track 2: "Turn Off the Radio" was later released as "Radio Freq" on the Revolutionary But Gangsta album.
Track 3: "That's War!" Samples from "Whoa!" by Black Rob.
Track 4: "We Need a Revolution" samples from "We Need a Resolution" by Aaliyah.
Track 5: "B.I.G. Respect" samples from "Juicy" by The Notorious B.I.G.
Track 7: "Food, Clothes + Shelter, Pt. 2" is the Sequel to the duo's debut single "Food, Clothes + Shelter".
Track 8: "Soulja Life Mentality" is a rename of "Soulja 4 Life" by Soulja Slim (originally released in 2001).
Track 9: "Get Up" originally released on The Coup's Party Music album.
Track 11: "It Was Written" samples from "It Was Written" by Damian Marley.
Track 13: "Look Around" originally released on The Beatnuts' A Musical Massacre album.
Track 15: "Sellin' D.O.P.E." originally released on the Slam: The Soundtrack album.
Track 18: "Hip Hop (RBG Mix)" Samples from "Break Ya Neck" by Busta Rhymes

Charts

References 

Dead Prez albums
Debut mixtape albums
2002 mixtape albums
Political music albums by American artists